Modern Love Mumbai is an Indian Hindi-language romantic comedy anthology Amazon Prime Video series produced by Pritish Nandy, that premiered on Amazon Prime Video on May 13, 2022. Its episodes run from 40 to 45 minutes.

Modern Love Mumbai is the Mumbai chapter based on the American anthology series Modern Love.

Premise
Modern Love Mumbai - Exploring six unique yet universal stories of human connection and love in its varied forms, including romantic, platonic, parental, sexual, familial, marital and self-love, which are presented in six different episodes. It premiered on Amazon Prime Video on 13 May 2022.

Cast
Fatima Sana Shaikh as Lalzari "Lali"
Wamiqa Gabbi as Megha
Tannishtha Chatterjee as Rayman
Dilip Prabhavalkar as Nazrul
Girija Oak as Kirti
Shovon Jaman as Driver
Pratik Gandhi as Manzar "Manzu" Ali
Ranveer Brar as Rajveer
Tanuja as Baai
Kashmira Irani as Rehana
Rushad Rana as Zohaib
Talat Aziz as Shabbir
Manasi Joshi Roy as Shaheen
 Yeo Yann Yann as Sui
Meiyang Chang as Ming
Naseeruddin Shah as Pappi Singh
Anurag Kashyap as Self
Imaad Shah as Self
Sarika as Dilbar Sodhi
Danesh Razvi as Kunal
Navneet Nishan as Raj Puri
Purnima Rathod as Reena
Yamini Das as Seema Sanghvi
Ahsaas Channa as Siya
Tanvi Azmi as Author Nilofer
Rahul Vohra as Vijay Baijal
Masaba Gupta as Saiba
Ritwik Bhowmik as Parth
Dolly Singh as Aashna
Nazneen Madan as Reema
Prateik Babbar as Rohan
Aadar Malik as Suhas
Chitrangada Singh as Latika
Arshad Warsi as Daniel "Danny"
Flora Jacob as Daniel's mother
Pushtii Shakti as Alicia Martins
Mita Vashisht as Amal Ali

Episodes

Season 1 (2022)

Reception 
Pallabi Dey Purkayastha of The Times of India rated the film 4 out of 5 stars and wrote "Modern Love Mumbai navigates a wide range of topics, toppling barriers along the way, and what it has essentially taught me is that if external love is your only currency, then you will be spent". Priyanka Sharma of Pinkvilla rated the series 4 out of 5 stars and wrote "A layered, hopeful & brilliant anthology with heartfelt performances". Swati Chopra of The Quint rated the series 3.5 out of 5 stars and wrote "Review: ‘Modern Love Mumbai’ Is a Tad Slow, but Love Saves the Day". Saibal Chatterjee of NDTV rated the series 3.5 out of 5 stars and wrote "No matter what the gender of the director is or what the essential tilt of each story is, it is the women, both the fictional characters and the performers who portray them, who make the anthology worthwhile". Anuj Kumar of The Hindu stated "With compelling performances that accompany these poetic yet truthful representations in Modern Love: Mumbai, the shorts arrive like a breath of fresh air and leave us with a guileless smile".

See also
 Modern Love Hyderabad, Hyderabad chapter of Modern Love

References

External links
 

Amazon Prime Video original programming
2022 Indian television series debuts
Hindi-language television shows
Television shows set in Mumbai
Indian television series based on American television series
Indian anthology television series